Najmeh Abtin (born August 12, 1982 in Shiraz) is an Iranian archer.

At the 2008 Summer Olympics in Beijing Abtin finished her ranking round with a total of 568 points. This gave her the 60th seed for the final competition bracket in which she faced Kwon Un-Sil in the first round. The archer from North Korea was too strong and won the confrontation with 106-96, eliminating Abtin straight away.

References

1982 births
Living people
Olympic archers of Iran
Archers at the 2008 Summer Olympics
Iranian female archers
People from Shiraz
Sportspeople from Fars province
21st-century Iranian women